Thomas Clerk may refer to:
Thomas Clerk (priest), English priest
Thomas Clerk (MP for Midhurst), see Midhurst (UK Parliament constituency)
Thomas Clerk (MP for Dunwich), see Dunwich (UK Parliament constituency)

See also
Thomas Clerke (disambiguation)
Thomas Clark (disambiguation)
Thomas Clarke (disambiguation)